= Mawbima Lanka =

Mawbima Lanka is a non-profit foundation that promotes Sri Lankan made products to Sri Lankans within and outside of Sri Lanka.

Mawbima Lanka Foundation hosts an annual awards ceremony called “Suriya Sinha” Awards. Latest ceremony was held at the BMICH on December 18, 2008. The event saw 46 Sri Lankan home grown corporates being awarded brand names while 300 were presented with Suriya Sinha Award.
